The 2020 Speediatrics 150 presented by The NASCAR Foundation was the 20th and final stock car race of the 2020 ARCA Menards Series and the 20th iteration of the event. The race was held on Friday, October 16, 2020, in Kansas City, Kansas at Kansas Speedway, a 1.500 miles (2.414 km) permanent paved oval-shaped racetrack. The race took the scheduled 100 laps to complete. At race's end, Corey Heim of Venturini Motorsports would dominate to win first career ARCA Menards Series win and his first and only win of the season. Meanwhile, second-place finisher Bret Holmes, driving for his own team, Bret Holmes Racing, would lock up and win the 2020 ARCA Menards Series championship, winning by 12 points. To fill out the podium, Derek Griffith of Chad Bryant Racing would finish third.

Background 

Kansas Speedway is a 1.5-mile (2.4 km) tri-oval race track in Kansas City, Kansas. It was built in 2001 and hosts two annual NASCAR race weekends. The NTT IndyCar Series also raced there until 2011. The speedway is owned and operated by the International Speedway Corporation.

Entry list

Practice 
The only 30-minute practice session was held on Friday, October 16.

Starting lineup 
The starting lineup was determined by the current 2020 owner's points. As a result, Ty Gibbs of Joe Gibbs Racing would win the pole.

Race results

References 

2020 ARCA Menards Series
NASCAR races at Kansas Speedway
October 2020 sports events in the United States
2020 in sports in Kansas